Italy has sent athletes to every celebration of the modern Winter Olympic Games. The Italian National Olympic Committee (CONI) is the National Olympic Committee for Italy.

Medals

In bold maximum number of medals won by color.

Medals by sport
Update to Beijing 2022.

See also
Italy at the Olympics
Italy at the Olympics in athletics
Italy at the Summer Olympics

References

External links